{{DISPLAYTITLE:C11H22O}}
The molecular formula C11H22O (molar mass: 170.29 g/mol, exact mass: 170.1671 u) may refer to:

 Undecanal, also known as undecyl aldehyde
 2-Undecanone, also known as IBI-246 or methyl nonyl ketone